Zoni may refer to:

Places in Greece:
Zoni, Arcadia, a village in Arcadia
Zoni, Evros, a village in the Evros regional unit
Zoni, Kozani, a village in the Kozani regional unit
Agia Zoni, a place in the island of Samos

Other uses:
zōni, a general name for Japanese soup with rice cakes (mochi) 
The Zoni, a race of energy beings who appear in the Ratchet & Clank video games
A slang, sometimes pejorative term for a person from Arizona